The 1967 Temple Owls football team was an American football team that represented Temple University during the 1967 NCAA College Division football season. Temple won the championship of the Middle Atlantic Conference, University Division.

In its eighth season under head coach George Makris, the team compiled a 7–2 record, 4–0 against MAC opponents. The team played its home games at Temple Stadium in Philadelphia. John Konstantinos, John McAneney, and Jerry Prescutti were assistant coaches.

Sophomore halfback Mike Busch set Temple single-game records with 38 carries and 176 rushing yards in the team's November 4 victory over Bucknell. In addition, end Jim Callahan broke Andy Tomasic's Temple career scoring records with 22 touchdowns and 132 points.

Schedule

References

Temple
Temple Owls football seasons
Temple Owls football